The Canon EOS 850D, known in the Americas as the EOS Rebel T8i and in Japan as the EOS Kiss X10i, is a digital single-lens reflex camera announced by Canon on February 12, 2020.

Main features
 24.1-megapixel APS-C CMOS sensor with Dual Pixel CMOS AF
 45 cross-type AF points.
 DIGIC 8, standard ISO 100–25600, H:51200
 High-speed Continuous Shooting at up to 7.0 fps
 Built-in Bluetooth.
 4K UHD (at 23.98 fps) video recording capability
 Movie Electronic IS
 Built-in HDR and time-lapse recording capability
 15 Custom Functions with 44 settings settable with the camera
 By default, the 850D uses Canon's standard UI, but if desired, it can be switched to the more beginner-friendly graphic UI also found in the 77D.
 Compatible with Bluetooth remote BR-E1

Predecessor comparison
The Canon EOS Rebel T8i/850D is the successor to the Canon EOS Rebel T7i/800D with the following improvements.
 New 4K video recording capability (at 23.98 fps).
 Longer battery life: 800 vs 600 Shots.
 Faster continuous shooting (burst mode): 7.0 FPS vs 6.0 FPS.
 Better exposure metering
 Bigger RAW Buffer: 40 vs 24 Shots.
 Lighter weight: 471g vs 485g (14g lighter) without lenses.
 Addition of "AF ON" button to facilitate back-button focusing
 Addition of quick control dial

References

External links

Cameras introduced in 2020
Live-preview digital cameras
Canon EOS DSLR cameras